Leucophlebia afra is a moth of the family Sphingidae. It is found from Senegal to northern Uganda and Sudan in the east, and to Angola in the west.

The length of the forewings is 20–25 mm for males and up to 30 mm for females. The palpi and frons are red and the thorax is pink, the abdominal tergites are black edged distally with
orange. The forewings are various shades of pink with a creamy yellow median streak from the base to the apex and a creamy stigma. The hindwings are yellow to orange. The females are larger and darker than the males.

References

Leucophlebia
Moths described in 1891
Lepidoptera of the Democratic Republic of the Congo
Lepidoptera of West Africa
Lepidoptera of Uganda
Lepidoptera of Malawi
Lepidoptera of Tanzania
Lepidoptera of Zambia
Moths of Sub-Saharan Africa